The University of Social Sciences and Humanities, Vietnam National University of Ho Chi Minh City (abbreviation: USSH, VNU - HCM; Vietnamese: Trường Đại học Khoa học xã hội và Nhân văn, Đại học Quốc gia Thành phố Hồ Chí Minh) is one of the member universities of Vietnam National University, Ho Chi Minh City (VNU - HCM), which holds the 158th position in the QS University Rankings for Asia (QC 2021). VNU - HCM is also ranked in top 101–150 on QS Top Under 50 (QS 2021), in top 301 - 500 among the 786 higher education institutions from 78 countries by QS GER 2022, in top 601 - 800 on World's Universities for Social Sciences (THE 2022) and in top 193 of the world on the QS Graduate Employability Ranking (QS GER 2022).

USSH, VNU - HCM was formerly known as the College of Letters, University of Saigon, The University of Ho Chi Minh City. It is now the biggest research and training center in the field of social sciences and humanities in the South of Vietnam.

In October 2021, USSH, VNU - HCM officially claimed their autonomy in the development strategy.

History

Establishment

After the 1954 Geneva Accords, the French Preparatory College of Letters, an affiliate member of  the University of Saigon, was founded in November 1955, marking the establishment of the university. On March 1, 1957, the College of Letters, University of Saigon was officially established.

In October 1975, there were various changes in objectives, curricula and programs. In April 1976, the College of Letters and the College of Science (which is now The University of Science) united, forming The University of Ho Chi Minh City. This was the biggest training and basic scientific research center in the South of Vietnam

The institution became the social sciences and humanities branch in The University of Ho Chi Minh City from 1976 to 1996. On March 30, 1996, under the Decision No. 1233/QĐ-BGD&ĐT of the Ministry of Education and Training, the College of Letters was separated from The University of Ho Chi Minh City, renamed University of Social Sciences and Humanities.

On November 20, 2017, USSH, VNU - HCM celebrated the 60-year history of establishment and growth, attracting a great number of leaders, lecturers, alumni, students and partners  - marking a significant milestone in the history of the university.

Current status

The University of Social Sciences and Humanities has more than 890 faculty members and non-teaching staff. The percentage of the academic staff holding professorial titles or postgraduate degrees is 98.4%. There are more than 22,000 students enrolled in 28 undergraduate programs, 38 postgraduate programs and over 10 joint programs in collaboration with international partners.

The programs offer students access to a very diverse selection of academic options and enhance students’ capabilities to embrace the challenge of the country's modernization and industrialization, translating what they learn into professional achievements.

The university is one of the two biggest institutions in the field of social sciences and humanities in Vietnam. The university is the pioneering institution in offering new academic programs to meet societal demands such as Vietnamese Studies, Oriental Studies, Anthropology, International Relations, Urban Studies, Spanish Linguistics and Literature, Italian Linguistics and Literature, and so on. In addition, the university is the leading institution nationwide in having over 300 registered international students — from Japan, South Korea, Laos, Cambodia, the United States, Singapore, Austria, Turkey, Thailand, and Australia — in degree programs and over 2,000 students enrolled in short-term courses.

The university has about 22,000 undergraduate and postgraduate students in 28 undergraduate programs, 38 postgraduate programs and over 10 joint programs in collaboration with international partners.

Core values
Creativity - Leadership - Responsibility

Educational philosophy
Whole Person - Liberal - Multicultural Education

Green University Program
Green University Program was launched on May 11, 2019. The program has 3 main stages (awareness - action - formation of green culture): 
(1) awareness change to adapt to green lifestyle, 
(2) environmental protection activities, such as waste sorting, landscape regenerating, reducing and saying ‘no’ to using single-use plastics, creating green living and studying environment,
(3) a green lifestyle culture with green lifestyle mindset.

Training

Lecturers
USSH, VNU - HCM has the lecturers of the best quality in the field of social sciences and humanities in the South of Vietnam.

As of February 2021, there were 897 officers and lecturers. Amongst the 522 lecturers, there are 44 professors and assistant professors, 211 doctors, 271 masters. Those who have a doctoral degree account for 48% of the total number. A great number of top national  and international professors, scientists are also invited to teach and research annually.

There are hundreds of international lecturers teaching at USSH, VNU - HCM, most of them are from Germany, The USA, Japan, Korea, Italy, Spain, etc.

Training work
There are several academic disciplines taught at USSH, VNU - HCM, including Behavioral and Social Sciences, Human Sciences, Journalism and Information, Educational Sciences and Teacher Training, Social Services, Trade and Management, Hotel Management, Tourism, Sports and Personal Services. Amongst 14,000 students and postgraduates, there are 12,000 regular students (including 266 foreign ones) and over 1700 postgraduates. USSH, VNU - HCM attracts thousands of foreign learners coming here as undergraduates (Vietnamese Studies, International Relations, English Linguistics, etc.) and postgraduates (Vietnamese studies, English Linguistics, Linguistics, History, etc.) to learn the Vietnamese language as well as culture, history, etc.

Statistics show that the number of international students at USSH, VNU - HCM keep increasing annually. Coming from 95 countries and territories, they are here to learn and research, especially about Vietnamese culture and language. Specifically, the number was 4.133 in 2015, 4718 in 2016, 5037 in 2017, and 5974 in the first 8 months of 2018. USSH, VNU - HCM has become the leading university in training foreign students and learners. A lot of politicians, diplomatic service officers, businesspeople, managers, etc. studied Vietnamese Studies, History, Literature, International Relations and English Linguistics, etc. at USSH, VNU - HCM.

There are 13 languages taught at the undergraduate  level, including English, German, Italian, Russian, Japanese, Korean, Chinese, Thai, Indian, Indonesian, Arabic and Vietnamese (for foreigners).

Undergraduate programs 
As of June 2021, there are 34 undergraduate academic disciplines, including:

(1) Religious Studies;

(2) Journalism;

(3) Multimedia Communication;

(4) Social Work;

(5) Urban Studies;

(6) Geography (Majors: Cartography – Remote Sensing & GIS, Demographic & Social Geography, Economic Geography – Regional Development, Environmental Geography);

(7) Oriental Studies (Majors: Arabic Studies, Australian Studies, Indian Studies, Indonesian Studies, Thai Studies);

(8) Education;

(9) Educational Management;

(10) Educational Psychology;

(11) Korean Studies (Majors: Korean Economy - Politics - Diplomacy);

(12) History (Majors: Archaeology, Vietnam History, History Of The Vietnamese Communist Party, World History);

(13) Anthropology (Majors: Development Anthropology, Social And Cultural Anthropology In The Anglo-Saxon System);

(14) International Relations;

(15) English Linguistics and Literature (Majors: Translation - Interpreting, English Linguistics And Language Teaching, American-British Culture And Literature);

(16) French Linguistics And Literature;

(17) German Linguistics And Literature;

(18) Spanish Linguistics And Literature;

(19) Russian Linguistics And Literature;

(20) Chinese Linguistics and Literature;

(21) Italian Linguistics and Literature;

(22) Japanese Studies;

(23) Psychology;

(24) Library And Information Sciences;

(25) Philosophy (Majors: Philosophy, Political Sciences, Religious Studies, Scientific Socialism);

(26) Cultural Studies;

(27) Literature (Majors: Sinology & Nom Studies, Literature, Playwriting);

(28) Linguistics;

(29) Vietnamese Studies;

(30) Sociology;

(31) Tourism (Majors: Tour Guide, Travel Management, Hotel - Restaurant - Resort Management);

(32) Archives;

(33) Information Management;

(34) Office Management.

High-quality training programs:

There are 7 high-quality training programs, including: (1) English Linguistics and Literature; (2) International Relations; (3) Japanese Studies; (4) Journalism; (5) Tourism; (6) Chinese Linguistics and Literature; (7) German Linguistics and Literature.

International programs 
I. Bachelor Programs

1. Bachelor of Communication, major in journalism (2+2) collaborated with Deakin University, Australia (coordinated by Center for International Education)

2. Bachelor of Arts, major in International Relations (2+2) collaborated with Deakin University, Australia (coordinated by Center for International Education)

3. Bachelor of Science in English (2+2) collaborated with the University of Minnesota Crookston (coordinated by Center for International Education)

4. Bachelor of Arts in Chinese Language (2+2) collaborated with Guangxi Normal University  (coordinated by Center for International Education)

5. Bachelor of Arts in Vietnamese Studies (2+2) collaborated with Busan ​​University of Foreign Studies, South Korea (coordinated by Faculty of Vietnamese Studies)

6. Bachelor of Arts in Vietnamese Studies (2+2) collaborated with Hankuk University of Foreign Studies, South Korea (coordinated by Faculty of Vietnamese Studies)

7. Bachelor of Arts in Vietnamese Studies (2+2) collaborated with Youngsan University of Foreign Studies, South Korea (coordinated by Faculty of Vietnamese Studies)

8. Bilingual French - Vietnamese program in Bachelor of Arts in Geography collaborated with French Universities (coordinated by the Faculty of Geography)

II. Master Programs

1. Master of Science in Media and Communications Management, collaborated with University of Stirling, the UK (coordinated by Center for International Education)

2. Master of Arts in Linguistics with TESOL Concentration, collaborated with Benedictine University, the US (coordinated by Center for International Education)

Postgraduate programs
- 2 International programs: (1) Master of Science in Media and Communications (collaborated with Stirling University, the UK); (2) Master of Arts in Linguistics with TESOL Concentration (collaborated with Benedictine University, the US).

- 18 Doctoral Degree programs: (1) Theoretical Linguistic; (2) Comparative Linguistics; (3) Vietnamese Literature; (4) Theory of Literature; (5) Vietnam History; (6) World History; (7) Ethnology; (8) Archeology; (9) Philosophy; (10) Cultural Studies; (11) Russian Linguistic and Literature; (12) Management of Natural and Environmental Resources; (13) Dialectical Materialism and History Materialism; (14) Sociology; (15) Educational Management; (16) Library And Information Sciences; (17) Vietnamese Studies; (18) Anthropology.

- 34 Master's degree programs: (1) Journalism; (2) Vietnam Literature; (3) Foreign Literature; (4) International Relations; (5) Vietnam History; (6) World History; (7) History Of The Vietnamese Communist Party; (8) Educational Management; (9) Russian Linguistics and Literature; (10) Management of Natural and Environmental Resources; (11) Library And Information Sciences; (12) Scientific Socialism; (13) TESOL Methodology; (14) Cultural Studies; (15) Ethnology; (16) Anthropology; (17) Linguistics; (18) Philosophy; (19) Archeology; (20) Sociology; (21) Asian Studies; (22) Vietnamese Studies; (23) Geography; (24) Urban Studies; (25) Archives; (26) French Linguistics and Literature; (27) Clinical Psychology; (28) Tourism; (29) Social Work; (30) Education; (31) Sinology & Nom Studies; (32) Korean Studies; (33) Theory of Literature; (34) Political Sciences.

Accreditation - Certificate of Appreciation
Accreditation 

Certificate of Education Quality Accreditation in 2017
 Programs certified by ASEAN university network-quality assurance (AUN-QA): 
 Master of Arts in Vietnamese Studies
 Bachelor of Arts in English Language & Linguistics
 Bachelor of Arts in Journalism
 Bachelor of Arts in Social Work
 Bachelor of Arts in History
USSH is preparing for a quality assessment at the institutional level under the AUN-QA standards.

Certificate of Appreciation
 Third Class Independence Medal
 First Class Labor Medal
 Third Class Labor Medal
 Prime Minister Commendation
 The government's emulation flag
 Certificate of Merit from Ministry of Education and Training
 Certificate of Merit from National University - Ho Chi Minh City

Organization

Offices 
Administrative Affairs; Human Resources and Organization; Undergraduate Affairs; Student Affairs; Planning and Finance; Facilities and Equipment Management; Educational Inspectorate - Legality - Intellectual Property; External Relations and Research Affairs; Educational Testing and Quality Assurance; Communication and Enterprise Relations; Thu Duc Campus.

Faculty 

 Journalism
 Spanish Linguistics and Literature
 Italian Linguistics and Literature
 Korean Studies
 Japanese Studies
 Social Work
 Physical Education
 Anthropology
 International Relations
 Cultural Studies
 Geography
 Oriental Studies
 Education
 History
 English Linguistics & Literature
 German Linguistics & Literature
 Russian Linguistics & Literature
 French Linguistics & Literature
 Chinese Linguistics & Literature
 Literature & Linguistics
 Linguistics
 Philosophy
 Communication and Information
 Library & Information Science
 Archives and Office Management
 Vietnamese Studies
 Sociology
 Psychology
 Urban Studies
 Tourism

Centers 
Our university has 14 centers: (1) Foreign Languages; (2) International Education; (3) Development, Career Orientation and Human Resources Development; (4) Korean Studies; (5) International Studies; (6) Religion and Ethics Studies; (7) Thai Center; (8) Rural Development Saemaul Undong; (9) Theoretical and Applied Culturology; (10) Vietnamese and Southeast Asian Studies; (11) ASEAN Human Resources; (12) Center for Admission Conselling and Student Support; (13) Center for Mental Health Research and Support; (14) Advisory Center for Publication and Project Development.

Library 
The Library USSH was preceded by the Library University of Letters, part of the University of Saigon (officially established in 1955). In April 1977, the Library University of Letters and the Library University of Science merged into the Library University of Ho Chi Minh City to serve scientific research and training purposes. In March 1996, Library USSH was split from the Library University of Ho Chi Minh City

The library's mission is to provide materials in various fields of social sciences and humanities as well as to facilitate students and teachers in their training and research. It's responsible for organizing, managing, supplementing, collecting, and preserving various kinds of documents.

Campuses
USSH has 2 campuses: Main campus (in Dist 1) and Thu Duc campus:

The main campus is at 10-12 Dinh Tien Hoang Street, Ben Nghe Ward, District 1 with an area of 1.2 hectares. It is home to the president's and vice president's office, administrative offices, faculties, departments, and international centers. It also houses postgraduate students, foreign students and students in high-quality training programs.

Contact address: 10–12, Dinh Tien Hoang Str, Ben Nghe Ward, Dist 1, HCMC

Thu Duc campus, with an area of 23 hectares in Linh Trung Ward, Thu Duc City, is part of the 700-hectare college town of the Vietnam National University – Ho Chi Minh City. This campus is reserved for students of higher education and is also the place for many functional zones such as lecture halls, classrooms, playgrounds, library, museum, stadium, etc.

Contact address: USSH, University Town of VNUHCMC, Linh Trung Ward, Thu Duc city, HCMC

International linkages
Aspiring to become an internationally prestigious university, USSH, VNU - HCM, has always welcomed new opportunities to cooperate with institutions around the world. The university also strives to consolidate its relationships with existing partners.

USSH, VNU - HCM has partnered with nearly 400 institutions from 33 different countries and regions around the world. Each year, the university's global network grows not only in quantity, but also in quality with various collaborating activities:
 
 Long-term and short-term exchange programs for students and lecturers;
 International training and research programs;
 Undergraduate / postgraduate credit transfer systems and training programs in cooperation with other academic institutions and universities;
 International projects in the fields of education, entrepreneurship, climate change, etc.;
 International scientific conferences and seminars, as well as publications in cooperation with other research institutions and journals to study the fields of social sciences and humanities.

Over the years, the university's global network includes accredited institutions from the United States, Australia, Japan, Korea, Taiwan, Singapore, Canada, Germany, Italy, United Kingdom, France, Spain, China, Thailand, India, Malaysia, etc.

List of USSH, VNU-HCM Rectors

Current Board of Rectors
Rector: Assoc. Prof. Dr. Ngo Thi Phuong Lan (from May 4, 2018)

Vice Rectors
 Dr. Phan Thanh Dinh, in charge of Planning and Finance, Facilities and Equipment Management
 Dr. Pham Tan Ha, in charge of Undergraduate Training and Postgraduate Training, Educational Testing and Quality Assurance
 Dr. Le Hoang Dung, in charge of Internationalization of Training Programs, Student Affairs, Internal Relations, External Relations and Research Affairs

Past Rectors
1955–1957 College of Letters

-   1955 Nguyen Dinh Hoa

-   1955–1960 Nguyen Huy Bao

-   1960–1963 Nguyen Dang Thuc

-   1963–1964 Bui Xuan Bao

-   1964 Nguyen Dang Thuc

-   1965–1975 Nguyen Khac Hoach

1976–1996 University of Ho Chi Minh City

-   1976–1981 Ly Hoa

-   1981–1988 Phan Huu Dat

-   1990–1996 Nguyen Ngoc Giao

1996–Present University of Social Sciences and Humanities, Vietnam National University - Ho Chi Minh City

-   1996–1999 Nguyen Quang Dien

-   1999–2007 Ngo Van Le

-   2007–2018 Vo Van Sen

-   2018–present Ngo Thi Phuong Lan

Alumni
USSH, VNU-HCM is valued for its culture of respect, sharing and promoting learner identity. The curriculum is designed to provide students with their unique space for learning, research, international exchange, art and social service, as well as professional experience. Thus, USSH, VNU-HCM has always been a precious resource that provides highly qualified manpower for society, making positive impacts to the development of the country.

The university's notable alumni are some of Vietnam's leading politicians: 
- Mr. Truong Tan Sang (President of the Socialist Republic of Vietnam, 2011–2016 tenure),
- Ms. Truong My Hoa (Vice President of the Socialist Republic of Vietnam, 2022–2007 tenure),
- Ms. Dang Thi Ngoc Thinh (Vice President of the Socialist Republic of Vietnam, 9/2018–10/2018), 
- Ms. Nguyen Thi Kim Ngan (Chairwoman of the National Assembly of Vietnam, 2016-2021 tenure),
- Mr. Vo Van Thuong (Member of the Politburo, Standing member of the Communist Party of Vietnam (CPV) Central Committee's Secretariat, Head of Central Propaganda Department of the CPV, 2016–2021 tenure).

Among the alumni of the university are prominent artists that have made significant contributions for Vietnam Art and Literature: Tran Long An (Musician), Vu Duc Sao Bien (Musician), Ton That Lap (Musician), Duc Huy (Musician), Duong Thuy (Author), Ho Trung Dung (Singer), Hari Won (Singer, Actress), Tran Ngoc Lan Khue (Beauty queen, Model), Hoai Anh (Presenter), Tan Tai (Presenter), Dinh Ngoc Diep (Actress), Ribi Sachi (Model, Actress), Orange (Singer), etc.

Arts & Media
Along with its innovative, dynamic and educational environment, USSH, VNU-HCM beautiful campuses have been featured in numerous films and TV series: Cong Mat Troi, High Kick 2 (Vietnamese adaptation), Com Nguoi Series by FapTV, etc. Many photographers, filmmakers and poets have also been inspired by the university.

Remarks and mentions of USSH, VNU-HCM
Former State President Truong Tan Sang emphasized the role and position of the USSH, VNU-HCMC in the general development of the country in his speech at the university's 2018 Opening Ceremony: "USSH, VNU-HCM has aid our country in its development with the production of highly skilled intellectuals, including many prominent scientists, politicians, executives, authors and artists."

“As one of the two the leading national academic centers for social sciences and humanities, the University needs to operate in close coordination with the University of Social Sciences and Humanities, Vietnam National University Hanoi, as well as other Party and State organs, to formulate solutions that are strategic, long-term, and practical that tackle the country's contemporary issues in all fields," said Mr. Vo Van Thuong, Member of the Politburo, Standing member of the CPV Central Committee's Secretariat, Head of Central Propaganda Department of the CPV.

"It also means a great deal to me to be here in your country, for important parts of our national histories have been intertwined in ways that have affected all of us,” Prof. Drew Gilpin Faust, President of Harvard University, in her public lecture "Aftermath: War, Memory and History" at USSH, VNU-HCM on March 23, 2014.

“Vietnam is a dragon ready to take off; and it is up to you whether or not that dragon can soar. Always remember that the process is more important than the result. Study hard,” Speaker of the National Assembly of South Korea Chung Ui-hwa in his speech to the USSH, VNU-HCM students on March 20, 2015.

See also
 List of universities in Vietnam

Notes

External links
Official website

Universities in Ho Chi Minh City
Educational institutions established in 1955
1955 establishments in South Vietnam